"Tumhe Dillagi" is a ghazal song written by lyricist Purnam Allahabadi and composed by prominent Sufi singer of Pakistan Nusrat Fateh Ali Khan.

2013 remix

It was recreated and released as a single on 5 August 2013 by A1melodymaster for the album Reformed; which released on 16 March 2017 with different renewed songs of Nusrat Fateh Ali Khan.

2016 versions
Nusrat Fateh Ali Khan's nephew; Rahat Fateh Ali Khan; also recreated the song several times.

MTV Unplugged

His live performance for MTV Unplugged (India) season 5 episode 6 was released in 2016.

ARY Digital

ARY Digital also adopted his voice and released few days later for Nadeem Beyg's Pakistani drama serial Dil Lagi; starring Humayun Saeed and Mehwish Hayat. Music has been composed by Sahir Ali Bagga.

T-Series

The song was recreated by composer duo Salim–Sulaiman as a single music video. Producer Bhushan Kumar said, "Instead of just remixing the number, we have recreated the track with new lyrics" by Manoj Muntashir. The video, that has been directed by Kiran Deohans, stars actors Huma Qureshi and Vidyut Jammwal.

See also
Nusrat Fateh Ali Khan discography
Rahat Fateh Ali Khan discography

References

External links

Nusrat Fateh Ali Khan songs
Ghazal songs
2016 singles
T-Series (company) singles
Rahat Fateh Ali Khan songs
Songs with music by Salim–Sulaiman
Songs with lyrics by Manoj Muntashir